Bruno Catalano (born 1960) is a French sculptor, most renown for creating sculptures of figures with substantial sections missing.

Early life 

Originally from Morocco, Catalano is the third and youngest child of a Sicilian family. In 1970 the Catalano family left Morocco for France.  In 1982 he started working at the Société Nationale Maritime Corse Méditerranée. He stayed there 4 years. He cites his experience as a sailor as central to his inspiration. He is also an electrician.

Career 
Catalano was acquainted with sculpting in 1981 in Marseille where he enrolled in Françoise Hamel's modeling classes. After two years of education, he opened his own art practice in 1985 and secured an oven in which he would bake his first clay figure. Later Catalano began to make big bronze sculptures. His first works were compact and conventional but the later series become increasingly expressive. In 2004 a flaw in one of his characters – a depiction of Cyrano – prompted him to dig and hollow out the chest. A new path of work ensued.

An exhibition of Catalano's sculptures entitled Les Voyageurs took place in Marseille in September 2013, to celebrate its status as the European Capital of Culture with ten life-size sculptures exhibited at the port of Marseille.

References

20th-century French sculptors
French male sculptors
21st-century French sculptors
21st-century French male artists
Living people
Moroccan contemporary artists
Moroccan people of Italian descent
People from Khouribga
1960 births